Melina is a feminine given name of Greek origin derived from the word "méli" (honey). 
Notable people with the name include:

Melina Almodóvar, Puerto Rican salsa singer, songwriter, dancer, and entertainer
Melina Bath, Australian politician
Melina Delú, Argentinian politician
Melina Džinović, Serbian fashion designer
Melina Georgousakis, Australian scientist and founder of Franklin Women
Melina Gomba, South African Member of Parliament
Melina Havelock, fictional character in James Bond
Melina Kanakaredes, Greek-American actress
Melina Laboucan-Massimo, Cree/Canadian climate justice advocate
Melina León, Puerto Rican merengue singer and actress
Melina Marchetta, Australian author
Melina Matsoukas, Greek-American director
Melina Mercouri, Greek actress, singer, and politician
Melina Perez, American professional wrestler
Melina Teno, Brazilian water polo player
Melina Turk, Canadian squash player

English feminine given names
Greek feminine given names
Italian feminine given names
Serbian feminine given names
Spanish feminine given names
Portuguese feminine given names